Forced retention refers to the act of applying pressure to employees to deter them from leaving a company. The most common way to do this is through legal means, such as non-compete and non-disclosure agreements. Given an adequately broad agreement, a company may threaten employees who try to leave for competitors (or in some cases, non-competitors) with legal action. In some countries, the government may implement similar laws or policies to prevent or discourage employees from leaving certain companies or government organizations. It has also been applied to companies which offers significant financial benefits to employees to encourage them to stay, in particular after a merger (for example, a minimum period to qualify for stock options), but this usage is commonly considered incorrect.

Forced retention is most commonly used by companies on the decline, or at least with limited growth prospects. Top employees will often join a small or mid-size company, with significant growth potentials. They will also often join financially stable  companies, which can afford to provide employees with very good remuneration packages, and large amounts of freedom (for instance, in pure R & D departments). Once the company begins to decline, many of the top employees will want to leave for greener pastures, while the poor-performing employees (who may have a difficult time finding employment) will cling to their jobs, radically speeding the decline. Companies will occasionally implement forced retention policies to try to stem the brain drain.

An example involves the US military in Iraq. After invading Afghanistan and Iraq, U.S. military resources were stretched. As a result, the military implemented a stop-loss policy, under which it could unilaterally extend a soldier's contract.

See also 
Employee retention

Termination of employment